The Ghost is a fictional character, a superhero that appeared in comic books published by Nedor Comics. His first appearance was in Thrilling Comics #3 (April 1940). The character is loosely based on the pulp hero created by G.T. Fleming-Roberts, who was variously known as the Ghost, the Ghost Detective, and the Green Ghost.

The character was later revived by writer Alan Moore for America's Best Comics.

Nedor Comics
The Ghost's origin was revealed in his first appearance in Thrilling Comics. The Ghost is George Chance, an occult investigator. Years of studying the mystical arts have given him the power of levitation, astral projection, turning himself or others invisible, and other seemingly magical powers.  The Ghost uses his powers to fight crime, which he does while accompanied by his wife, Betty.

According to Jess Nevins' Encyclopedia of Golden Age Superheroes, the Ghost's arch-enemy is "the evil (though not mad) scientist Dr. Fenton, who sends his kidnap victims (including America's greatest leaders) back to the Stone Age, and brings back monsters, villains, and women from the past. Chance also fights the super-hypnotist Dr. Volkan and Martians in a recap of Edgar Rice Burroughs' Barsoom novels".

The Ghost appeared as a backup feature in many issues of Thrilling Comics. His final Golden Age appearance was in issue #52 (February 1946).

America's Best Comics
Alan Moore revived the Ghost, along with many other Nedor Comics characters, for his Tom Strong series. In Tom Strong #12 (June 2001), the Cavalier was revealed to have been a member of SMASH, a superhero team that had been placed in suspended animation after an alien invasion from the moon in 1969. The Ghost was one of the heroes killed during that fight; however, thanks to his mystical powers he was able to remain in this reality in his astral form. He was revived 30 years later thanks to the efforts of Tom Strong. Now calling himself the Green Ghost, Chance reunited with his wife to continue his investigation of the paranormal. The Green Ghost has since joined the reunited SMASH.

Chance's widow later married science hero-turned detective Grant Halford (aka The Magnet).

Further reading
 ‘George Chance, The Green Ghost, Vol. 1’ review, ThePulp.net (2014)
 "Moonstone Brings Back the Green Ghost" by Dan Wickline, Bleeding Cool (2016)
 Deadly Excitements: Shadows and Phantoms by Robert Sampson, Bowling Green State University Popular Press (1989)
 Encyclopedia of Weird Detectives: Supernatural and Paranormal Elements in Novels, Pulps, Comics, Film, Television, Games and Other Media by Paul Green, McFarland & Co (2019)

References

External links
The Green Ghost at SMASH fansite

America's Best Comics superheroes
Astral projection in popular culture
Comics characters who use magic
Nedor Comics superheroes
Comics characters introduced in 1940
Comics characters with superhuman strength